The 2020 Royal Bernard Drôme Classic was the 7th edition of the La Drôme Classic cycle race. It was held on 1 March 2020 as a category 1.Pro race on the 2020 UCI Europe Tour and 2020 UCI ProSeries. The race started and finished in Livron-sur-Drôme.

Teams
Twenty teams were invited to the race. Of these teams, seven are UCI WorldTour teams, twelve are UCI Professional Continental teams, and one is a UCI Continental team.

UCI WorldTeams

 
 
 
 
 
 
 

UCI Professional Continental Teams

 
 
 
 
 
 
 
 
 
 
 
 

UCI Continental Teams

Result

References

2020 in French sport
2020 UCI Europe Tour
2020 UCI ProSeries
La Drôme Classic
March 2020 sports events in France